Ariel 4, known pre-launch as UK 4, was a British ionospheric research satellite, which was operated by the Science and Engineering Research Council. It was launched 11 December 1971, aboard an American Scout rocket. Experiments were designed to meet one scientific objective, making it the first mission-oriented satellite for the UK. It was also the first satellite in the Ariel programme to contain an American experiment. Ariel 4 decayed from orbit on 12 December 1978

Design

Development
Ariel 4 leveraged both the design and hardware of Ariel 3 to reduce costs. Ariel 4 used pieces of its predecessor's flight backup unit and spare parts. The satellite cost about 1.25 million pounds.

Operation
British Aircraft Corporation was the prime contractor. It was the first satellite in the Ariel programme to be able to perform attitude maneuvers.

Sensors
It was the first satellite of the Ariel programme to have a mission-orientated payload, where all of the experiments are designed to research one scientific objective. The scientific objective was to "...study the interaction between high energy charged particles and electromagnetic radiation in the upper ionsphere and magnetosphere. Three of the five experiments on Ariel 3 were to determine a single scientific objective, so those three were improved for use on Ariel 4 and an additional experiment was added.

It was also the first in the program to carry an American experiment.

Mission

Launch
The launch of Ariel 4 occurred at 20:47:01 GMT on 11 December 1971, from Space Launch Complex 5 at the Vandenberg Air Force Base. It was conducted by NASA, using a Scout B-1 rocket.

Operations
It decayed from orbit on 12 December 1978.

See also

Notes

References

1971 in spaceflight
Space programme of the United Kingdom
Satellites formerly orbiting Earth
British Aircraft Corporation
Spacecraft launched in 1971
Spacecraft which reentered in 1978